is an action-adventure video game developed by Game Republic, and published by Namco Bandai Games. The game was released in February 2011 for the PlayStation 3 and Xbox 360 systems. The game contains characters loosely based on, and named after, characters in the Faust legend, as well as several fairy tales.

Gameplay

Plot
The setting of Knights Contract is in a fictional Europe during the Middle Ages, with dark fantasy characteristics, involving witchcraft, sorcery, and otherworldly monsters. A superstitious hatred for witches is the norm for society. As a result, people employ witch-hunters and witch-executioners. The game follows Heinrich Hofmann, an experienced witch-executioner plagued by a curse, and a young woman named Gretchen, who is the reincarnation of a witch Heinrich executed under the orders of Dr. Faust. In what initially seems an act of revenge for her execution, Gretchen curses Heinrich with immortality.

At the same time, Dr. Faust, the game's main antagonist, creates hordes of monsters that terrorize the world. The mad scientist is responsible for the deaths of Gretchen and her fellow witches. Gretchen, intending to protect humanity, decides to confront the menace directly, by joining forces with the cursed executioner, Heinrich. The now-immortal Heinrich is forced to protect the mortal Gretchen from danger, in hopes of undoing the curse and defeating Dr. Faust.

Development

The title was announced in the May 20 issue of Famitsu. A trailer for the game was shown at E3 2010. Knights Contract was the last game developed by Game Republic before the studio shut down.

Reception

The PlayStation 3 version received "mixed" reviews, while the Xbox 360 version received "generally unfavorable" reviews according to video game review aggregator Metacritic. In Japan, Famitsu gave it a score of 28 out of 40, while Famitsu X360 gave the Xbox 360 version a score of one six, one eight, and two sevens.

411Mania gave the Xbox 360 version a score of 6.5 out of 10, calling it "a quest where the journey just doesn't seem worth the huge obstacles the developers ended up putting in your path, a 'close but no cigar' game which feels like an ultimate letdown. A guilty pleasure but it could have been so much more with a bit more polish and effort behind it." However, Metro gave it two out of ten, calling it "A monument to not only everything that is wrong with escort missions but with bad action game design in general." The A.V. Club gave it a D−, saying, "Technical excellence does not a great game make. By the same token, a game can be great in spite of mechanical and thematic problems. Games with broken parts can still succeed. Knights Contract does not."

References

External links
 
 
  (EU)
  

2011 video games
Action-adventure games
Hack and slash games
Fantasy video games set in the Middle Ages
Dark fantasy video games
Game Republic games
Bandai Namco games
PlayStation 3 games
Single-player video games
Video games set in Germany
Video games developed in Japan
Video games featuring female protagonists
Video games featuring non-playable protagonists
Video games about witchcraft
Xbox 360 games